The Baztan is a river in northern Spain. It is the main, right headwater of the river Bidasoa. Downstream from the confluence with the river Marin at Oronoz-Mugairi, it is called Bidasoa.

References

Rivers of Spain
Rivers of Navarre
Gipuzkoa
1Baztan